The Youth Left (or SG) was the youth wing of the Democratic Party of the Left from 1991 to 1998 and the Democrats of the Left from 1998 until 2007, when the Democratic Party was founded and the SG joined the Young Democrats.

National secretaries of the SG
 Gianni Cuperlo (1990–1992)
 Nicola Zingaretti (1992–1995)
 Giulio Calvisi (1995–1997)
 Vinicio Peluffo (1997–2001)
 Stefano Fancelli (2001–2007)
 Fausto Raciti (2007)

National congresses

References

Youth wings of political parties in Italy
Youth wings of social democratic parties